Robert Hewitt (July 27, 1906 – January 18, 1978) was an American wrestler. He competed in the men's freestyle bantamweight at the 1928 Summer Olympics. Collegiately, Hewitt wrestled at the University of Michigan and was a two-time NCAA finalist.

References

External links
 

1906 births
1978 deaths
American male sport wrestlers
Olympic wrestlers of the United States
Wrestlers at the 1928 Summer Olympics
People from Traverse City, Michigan